Mahim Bay is a bay, part of the Arabian Sea in Mumbai, Maharashtra, India. The southern end is Worli, northern end is Bandra Reclamation and Mahim is in the centre. The bay was named after the islands of Mahim and Salsette were merged in the early 19th century. The Mithi River drains into Mahim Creek which drains into the Bay, and forms the border between the Mumbai city (Churchgate to Mahim) and its Suburbs (Bandra to Dahisar).

During the colonial era, the Portuguese built a watch tower called Castella de Aguada on the northern side. Later, the British built the Worli Fort to the south and Mahim Fort near the creek to defend the seven islands of Bombay against attacks by the Portuguese and the Marathas.

The bay holds a small indigenous fishing population known as the Kolis. A large infrastructural project, the Bandra-Worli Sea Link, now links the two ends of the bay by a flyover bridge which reduced the commuting time between the suburbs and the city. During the monsoon season the sea waves hit against the walls and sometimes also enters the small bylanes. The bay is highly polluted due to the drainage of the polluted Mithi river into it. Mahim bay shifts according to the tide; during high tide, water rushes to the Bandra side and during low tide, the Worli side has much water. Recently tar deposits have been found in the bay. The bay is highly unsafe for swimming or Ganpati immersion. The flooding situation is growing worse. Approximately the sea floods the area once a week. It reaches up to the walls of Bombay Scottish School. The school authorities are advised to shut their sea facing gates to ensure safety of the children. The most frightening situation occurred after the start of the Bandra-Worli Sea Link project. the waves entered the small bylanes with great velocity. The Cafe Coffee Day and the Barista outlets were nearly touched by the rising waves. The citizens living on the sea facing side of the Veer Savarkar Marg have been warned repeatedly of building check walls to prevent loss of lives and destruction of any movable or immovable property. The students of Bombay Scottish School are also repeatedly told not to go on the beach for safety reasons. The environmentalists in that area have said that the bay has come ahead nearly by 100 metres. This bay is a cause of concern for the local bodies. It is predicted that the waves will nearly submerge Shivaji Park if their arrival to the shore is so fast. The land at the bay has sunk by 5 mm due to the rampant erosion due to the ferocious sea.

See also 
Back Bay

References

Links 

 Mumbai to get two artificial beaches along Marine Drive and Mahim Bay, costing over Rs.400cr
 Fishermen blockade Mahim bay
 Govindan, K. and Desai, B.N. (1980) Mahim Bay: a polluted environment of Bombay. Journal of the Indian Fisheries Association, 10-11, pp. 5-10.

Bays of India
Geography of Mumbai
Landforms of Maharashtra
Bodies of water of the Arabian Sea
Bays of the Indian Ocean